Wemmers is a surname. Notable people with the surname include:

Carl Wemmers (1845–1882), German chess master
Jacobus Wemmers (1598–1645), Carmelite friar

See also
Remmers